{{Infobox government agency
| native_name_a = 
| type = ministry
| name = Ministry of Higher and Technical Education, Government of Maharashtra
| native_name = मंत्रालय उच्च व तंत्र शिक्षण विभाग, महाराष्ट्र शासन 
| seal = Seal of Maharashtra.png
| seal_width = 200
| seal_caption = Seal of the state of Maharashtra
| logo = 
| logo_width = 
| logo_caption = 
| picture =  
| picture_width = 
| picture_caption = 
| jurisdiction =  Maharashtra
| headquarters = Mantralay, Mumbai
| region_code = IN
| minister1_name = Chandrakant Patil
| minister1_pfo = Cabinet Minister
| deputyminister1_name = Vacant, TBD
since 29 June 2022
| deputyminister1_pfo = Minister of State
| child1_agency = 
| child2_agency = 
| website = 
| formed =  
| employees = 
| budget = 
| Secretary = Mr. Vikas Rastogi, IAS) 
| chief1_position = 
| chief2_name = 
| chief2_position = 
| parent_department = Government of Maharashtra
}}

The Ministry of Higher and Technical Education is a ministry of the Government of Maharashtra. It is responsible for designing and implementing higher and technical education related policies in the state Maharashtra

The Ministry is headed by a cabinet level minister. Chandrakant Patil''' is current Minister of Higher and Technical.

Head office

List of Cabinet Ministers

List of Ministers of State

List of Principal Secretary

History 
Education and employment ministries were separated in 1992 and as a result, a separate ministry was established for higher and technical education.

Departments
Higher Education 
Technical Education 
Art Education 
University Section 
National Service Scheme

Autonomous bodies
Admission Regulating Authority (ARA)
Maharashtra State Board of Technical Education 
Rashtriy Ucchatar Shiksha Abhiyan 
Fee Regulatory Authority

References

External links 
 

Government ministries of Maharashtra
Education in Maharashtra
Maharashtra
Higher education in India
Career and technical education